Jennifer Sandra Harß (born 14 July 1987) is a German ice hockey goaltender and member of the German national ice hockey team, currently playing with the ECDC Memmingen teams in the German Women's Ice Hockey Bundesliga (DFEL) and the Oberliga and ESC Kempten of the Bayernliga. She represented Germany at the Olympic women's ice hockey tournaments in 2006 and 2014.

Playing career
Harß has been a member of the Germany women's national ice hockey team since 2005. She has participated in nine IIHF World Championship tournaments. In three games played for Germany at the 2006 Winter Olympics, she had a goals against average of 1.89 and recorded 97 saves. At the 2008 IIHF World Championships, she had more than half of the playing time in net for Team Germany.

NCAA
During the 2009–10 season, Harß filled in for starting goalie Kim Martin. She made a team record of 1138 saves and led all goalies in the NCAA. In 39 starts, Harß won 29 contests, the second most wins in one season in Bulldogs history. In addition, she played more minutes than any other goaltender in the NCAA. Harß accumulated 2386:51 minutes between the pipes while breaking the Bulldogs single-season record for saves, making 1062 in 37 outings. In the championship game of the 2010 Frozen Four tournament, Harß set a team record and NCAA postseason record for most saves in a game with 49. On 7 September 2011, it was announced that Harß was appointed one of two assistant captains for the 2011–12 Minnesota Duluth Bulldogs women's ice hockey season.

Milestones
 First Game: 2 October 2009 (vs. Robert Morris)
 First Start: 2 October 2009 (vs. Robert Morris)
 First Win: 2 October 2009 (vs. Robert Morris)
 First Assist: 27 February 2010 (vs. North Dakota)
 Most Saves in a Game: 49 (vs. Cornell, 21 March 2010)
 First Shutout : 11 October 2009 (vs. St. Cloud State)
 Led NCAA goalies in saves (2009–10)
 Led NCAA goalies in minutes played (2009–10)

Awards and honors
 NCAA Champion – 2010
 All-WCHA Third Team selection (2009–10)
 2009–10 WCHA Preseason Rookie of the year finalist: Jennifer Harß 
 WCHA Co-Defensive Player of the Week (Week of 7 December)
 WCHA's Final Face-Off All-Tournament Team 2010

Personal
Harß is a 2006 graduate of the FOS & BOS High School in Kaufbeuren.

References

External links

Living people
1987 births
Sportspeople from Füssen
German women's ice hockey goaltenders
Minnesota Duluth Bulldogs women's ice hockey players
Ice hockey players at the 2006 Winter Olympics
Ice hockey players at the 2014 Winter Olympics
Olympic ice hockey players of Germany
German expatriate ice hockey people
German expatriate sportspeople in the United States